The US state of Texas has 23 villages within its borders.

Villages
Texas